Nicholas J. Rusch (February 16, 1822 – September 22, 1864) was an American tutor, farmer, member of the Iowa Senate (1858–1860), the Lieutenant Governor of Iowa (1860–1862), Iowa's Commissioner of Immigration, and a captain in the Union Army during the American Civil War.

Biography
Nicholas Johann Rusch was born on February 16, 1822, in Sankt Michaelisdonn, Holstein. He attended elementary school at Marne, the gymnasium at Meldorf, the Segeberg Seminary and the University of Kiel. He immigrated to the United States in 1847 and while en route he tutored the children in a family. He settled on a farm in Scott County, Iowa near the city of Davenport. He was part of the first wave of immigrants who settled in the area from Schleswig-Holstein.

Rusch soon acquired knowledge of the language, laws, and institutions of his adopted country. He was a member of the Republican Party and was nominated by Scott County Republicans to serve in the Iowa Senate in 1857. He won the general election and while in the Senate he focused his attention on alcohol laws, land ownership of foreign-born Iowans, and German language usage in official documents. He became an influential leader among German-Americans and within the Republican Party. In 1859 he was nominated by the Republican State Convention for Lieutenant Governor on the ticket with Samuel J. Kirkwood. As Lieutenant Governor, Rusch presided over the Iowa Senate for two years.

After serving his term, Rusch was appointed by Governor Kirkwood to be Iowa's Commissioner of Immigration. He spent his time in New York where he distributed promotional information about the state. He returned to Iowa ten months later as immigration nearly came to a halt during the Civil War. Rusch joined the Union Army when Kirkwood appointed him to the Commissary Department with the rank of captain. In Vicksburg, Mississippi, he developed a plan to protect Union steamboats on the Mississippi River from guerilla attacks by positioning lumberjacks along the river to provide steamboats with fuel and to interfere in case the boats were attacked. The plan was approved by General Ulysses S. Grant and Rusch left for New York where he recruited immigrants for his lumberjack army. Before he could be put his plan into action, however, Rusch died suddenly after his return to Vicksburg on September 22, 1864. He was buried in Pine Hill Cemetery in Davenport.

References

1822 births
1864 deaths
People from Dithmarschen
People from the Duchy of Holstein
People from Scott County, Iowa
Republican Party Iowa state senators
Lieutenant Governors of Iowa
People of Iowa in the American Civil War
German-American culture in Iowa
German emigrants to the United States
19th-century American politicians
Union Army officers
United States politicians killed during the Civil War